Cage of Evil is a low-budget 1960 crime film starring Ron Foster and Patricia Blair.

Plot
Scott Harper is a frustrated police detective who is constantly passed over for promotion. When he is assigned to gain the confidence of Holly, the girlfriend of a robbery suspect, the couple fall in love and then plot to murder Holly's boyfriend and run off to Mexico with the loot.

Cast
Ronald Foster as Scott Harper
Patricia Blair as Holly Taylor (billed as Pat Blair)
Harp McGuire as Murray Kearns
John Maxwell as Don Melrose
Preston Hanson as Tom Colton
Doug Henderson as Barney
Hugh Sanders as Martin Bender
Helen Kleeb as Mrs. Melton
Robert Shayne as Victor Delmar
Owen Bush as Sgt. Ray Dean
Ted Knight as Dan Ivers
Howard McLeod as Kurt Romack

Reception
In a contemporary review for the New York Daily News, critic Maxine Dowling called Cage of Evil "a bitter and contrived tale...It's an uninteresting, slowly paced melodrama that does nothing for anyone concerned, least of all our much maligned police."

The New York Post commented that "performances are better than fair," and that the film "is a shoot-it-out opus with little surprise. The audience knows from the beginning that detective Ron Foster is unhappy with his lot. Much work, no promotion. We wait for him, on the trail of a diamond thief, to go over to the other side. This he does, not only because he envies the spoils, but because he has fallen for the crook's moll, Pat Blair. They get theirs!" 

TV Guide wrote that "it's not bad for grade-B crime drama."

Shown on the Turner Classic Movies show 'Noir Alley' with Eddie Muller on October 22, 2022.

See also
 List of American films of 1960

References

External links

1960 films
1960 crime films
1960s American films
1960s English-language films
American black-and-white films
American crime films
Films directed by Edward L. Cahn
Films produced by Edward Small
Films scored by Paul Sawtell
Films set in Los Angeles
United Artists films
English-language crime films